Hervé d'Encausse (born 27 September 1943) is a retired French pole vaulter. He competed at the 1964, 1968 and 1972 Olympics and finished seventh in 1968. His son Philippe is also a retired Olympic pole vaulter,  and is currently world record holder Renaud Lavillenie's coach.

References

1943 births
Living people
Sportspeople from Hanoi
French male pole vaulters
Olympic athletes of France
Athletes (track and field) at the 1964 Summer Olympics
Athletes (track and field) at the 1968 Summer Olympics
Athletes (track and field) at the 1972 Summer Olympics
European Athletics Championships medalists
Mediterranean Games bronze medalists for France
Athletes (track and field) at the 1963 Mediterranean Games
Mediterranean Games medalists in athletics
20th-century French people
21st-century French people